The Israeli Air Force Band (IAF Band) is the principal musical ensemble of the Israeli Air Force,  a service branch of the Israel Defense Force (IDF).

History
The Israeli Air Force Band was established in May 1948. It was directed by Erich Tych, who held the position for 35 years, until his death in 1983. Under Tych, the band was similar in style to Big bands and jazz bands.

The band is currently composed of a number of ensembles that play different genres such as ethnic music, jazz, and rock and roll.

Notable members 
Ania Bukstein – Russian-Israeli actress, singer-songwriter, and pianist. She was drafted into the band after graduating high school and worked as a soloist during her tenure.
Danni Bassan – Former member of the Israeli rock band T-Slam.
Guy Zu-Aretz – Israeli actor and television host known for being the host of the show Survivor.
Shai Gabso –  Israeli singer who won third place in the Israeli reality show Kokhav Nolad. He composed music for the band.
Udi Spielman – Israeli singer and Hazzan. He was a soloist during his time with the band.
Omer Shaish – Israeli composer and pianist.
Gal Abargil – Israeli musician and International DJ & Producer.

See also
Music of Israel

References 

1948 establishments in Israel
Israeli Air Force
Israeli military bands
Military units and formations established in 1948
Air force bands